Ivan Ivanovych Stankovych (born 7 February 2002) is a Ukrainian professional footballer who plays as a left midfielder for Ukrainian Second League club Khust on loan from Mynai.

References

External links
 
 

2002 births
Living people
People from Svaliava
Ukrainian footballers
Association football midfielders
MFA Mukachevo players
FC Mynai players
FC Uzhhorod players
FC Khust players
Ukrainian Second League players
Ukrainian Amateur Football Championship players